Mokoni is a village in Tiom district, Lanny Jaya Regency in Highland Papua province, Indonesia. Its population is 1655.

Climate
Mokoni has a cold subtropical highland climate (Cfb) with heavy rainfall year-round.

References

Villages in Highland Papua